The Honesty of the Lock is a 1950 Spanish drama film directed by Luis Escobar. It was entered into the 1951 Cannes Film Festival.

Cast
 Esperanza Barrera
 Dolores Bremón
 Paquita Bresoli
 Modesto Cid
 Margarita de Córdoba - dancer
 Miguel de Granada
 María Victoria Durá
 Ramón Elías
 Juan García
 Mercedes Gisbert
 Manuel González
 Concha López Silva
 Ricardo Martín
 Ramón Martori
 Pedro Mascaró
 Pilar Muñoz
 María Esperanza Navarro
 Mayrata O'Wisiedo
 José Manuel Pinillos
 Antonio Polo
 Pedro Puche
 Francisco Rabal
 Ramón Vaccaro
 Juan Velilla

References

External links

1950 films
1950s Spanish-language films
1950 drama films
Spanish black-and-white films
Films directed by Luis Escobar Kirkpatrick
Spanish drama films
1950s Spanish films